Baltic Air Surveillance Network (BALTNET) is an air defense radar network operated by the Baltic States of Latvia, Lithuania and Estonia.

Structure 

The Baltic Air Surveillance Network (BALTNET) is one of the commands within the NATO Integrated Air Defense System (NATINADS). BALTNET's Regional Airspace Surveillance Coordination Centre (RASCC) is located in Karmėlava and reports to NATO's (CAOC) Combined Air Operations Centre: CAOC Uedem.

 Regional Airspace Surveillance Coordination Centre (RASCC), in Karmėlava
 (Estonian Air Force) Air Operations Centre, at Ämari Air Base
 Radar Station, in Levalõpme, with GM 403
 Radar Station, in Otepää, with GM 403
 Radar Station, in Kellavere, with AN/TPS-77
 (Latvian Air Force) Air Operations Centre, at Lielvārde Air Base
 1st Radiotechnical (Radar) Post, at Lielvārde Air Base, with AN/TPS-77
 2nd Radiotechnical (Radar) Post, in Audriņi, with AN/TPS-77
 3rd Radiotechnical (Radar) Post, in Čalas, with AN/TPS-77
 (Lithuanian Air Force) Airspace Operations Centre, in Karmėlava
 Radar Station in Antaveršis
 Radar Station in Degučiai
 Radar Station in Ceikiškės
Lithuanian radars are manufactured by Indra Sistemas.

See also 
 Airspace Surveillance and Control Command (Lithuania)

References 

Air defence radar networks
Military projects of the Baltic states
Military of Lithuania
Military of Latvia
Military of Estonia